Woolly Creek is a stream in Barry and Stone counties in the Ozarks of southwest Missouri.

A variant name was "Wooley Creek". The creek has the name of Anderson Wooley, a pioneer settler.

See also
List of rivers of Missouri

References

Rivers of Barry County, Missouri
Rivers of Stone County, Missouri
Rivers of Missouri